= 10/1 =

10/1 may refer to:

- October 1 (month-day date notation)
- January 10 (day-month date notation)
